Kārlis Skalbe ( — 1945 April 14) was a Latvian writer, poet, and activist. He is best known for his 72 fairy tales which are really written for adults. He has been called the 'King of Fairytales', and his words, Tēvzemei un Brīvībai (For Fatherland and Freedom), are inscribed on the Monument of Freedom in Riga.

Childhood and schooling 
Skalbe was born in Vecpiebalga Parish, in the heart of Vidzeme, symbolically the same year that one of the other greats of Latvian literature, the poet Auseklis (Miķelis Krogzemis), died in exile. His father Jānis was a blacksmith; his mother, Ede, was, like his father, a Piebalga native. The Skalbes had ten children of which Kārlis was the youngest; five of his siblings died in early childhood.

Skalbe's parents were devout Moravian Christians. His father was an avid reader both of contemporary works and of the Bible—said to be able to quote it by heart, and also a great story-teller. Skalbe himself learned to read at 7, taught by his mother. Skalbe's mother took over as head of the household when his father died at 55, when Skalbe was only 8. Their means were meager—Skalbe's mother worked for neighbors as a menial laborer. She found strength in her faith; she was an active member of the Herrnhuter Brüdergemeine, participating in meetings and services, and reportedly an excellent singer. Her religiosity was a strong influence on the young Skalbe—later to capture this period of his childhood in his poem Gurstot (Wearied), part of his collection Cietumnieka sapņi (Prisoner's Dreams).

Skalbe first entered school in Veļķe Parish, attending from 1887 to 1890, where his favorite subject was Bible studies. There he developed a close relationship with Ernests Felsbergs, later art history professor and rector of the University of Latvia, as a teacher. Skalbe's first encounter with poetry, however, was not at school but during his four summers as a shepherd, where in his bed under the hay mattress he found a long mislaid book of poems by Pēteris Ceriņš, a lyric poet active in the 1860s and 70's. Skalbe wrote his first poem at 12, and tried his hand at his first fairy tale not long after.

From 1890 to 1895 (approximate), Skalbe attended the Vecpiebalga congregational school, where his sister Līze helped pay for his studies. His schoolmates included H. Albāts, to become a diplomat; and Jānis Roze, to become a book publisher whose premier publishing house is still active today. Skalbe furthered his religious studies, was schooled in essay writing, and was exposed to and deeply influenced by the novels of Turgenev and Dostoyevsky.

In 1910 he married Lizeti Erdmani, a translator (1886-1972).

Beginnings as an author 

Skalbe's next steps leaving school were unclear. His sister tried to place him with a bookseller, Veinbergs, in Rīga, but Skalbe didn't know German. He landed a job at another bookseller, Bērziņš, where he lasted all of one day. His most memorable experience in all of this was his initial trip to Rīga, captured later in his memoir Mans Ziemassvētku brauciens (My Christmas Ride, 1933).

Career 
He worked as a teacher and journalist.  After the 1905 revolution he moved to Switzerland, Finland and Norway.  He returned to Latvia in 1909 and was later sent to jail for 18 months for revolutionary activities.  He fought as a Latvian Rifleman in 1916.

He stayed in Latvia until 1944 when it became obvious that after the war the USSR would again occupy Latvia.  He then moved to Sweden and died a few months later.

In 1987 his former summer house was opened as a public museum dedicated to his life and works. During his lifetime, Skalbe was awarded the Order of the Three Stars 3rd Class and the Order of the Lithuanian Grand Duke Gediminas.

References
 Bear's Ears: An Anthology of Latvian Literature. p135

1879 births
1945 deaths
People from Cēsis Municipality
People from Kreis Wenden
Democratic Centre (Latvia) politicians
Members of the People's Council of Latvia
Deputies of the Constitutional Assembly of Latvia
Deputies of the 1st Saeima
Deputies of the 4th Saeima
Latvian writers
Expatriates from the Russian Empire in Switzerland
Expatriates from the Russian Empire in Norway
Academic staff of the University of Latvia
Latvian Riflemen
Russian military personnel of World War I
Recipients of the Order of the Three Stars
Recipients of the Order of the Lithuanian Grand Duke Gediminas
Latvian World War II refugees
Latvian emigrants to Sweden